Romano Calò (6 May 1883 – 17 August 1952) was an Italian film actor. He appeared in 30 films between 1913 and 1945.

Selected filmography
 Il bacio di Cirano (1913)
 But It Isn't Serious (1921)
 Queen of the Night (1931)
 Steel (1933)
 The Anonymous Roylott (1936)
 The Last Days of Pompeo (1937)
 The Count of Brechard (1938)
 The Hero of Venice (1941)
 The Last Chance (1945)

References

External links
 
 

1883 births
1952 deaths
Italian male film actors
Italian male silent film actors
Male actors from Rome
20th-century Italian male actors